The National Union of Railway and Harbour Servants was a trade union established in South Africa in 1910.  It welcomed all races into membership.

In December 1935 it was infiltrated by the Afrikaner Broederbond who established an Afrikaner trade union called Die Spoorbund. Its members were also members of the NURAHS and they ensured that resolution was passed by the union conference to exclude non-white members.

References

Defunct trade unions in South Africa